Koichi Fujita (藤田浩一 Fujita Kōichi; born March 20, 1947 in Chiba, Chiba Prefecture, Japan – October 11, 2009 in Kawasaki City, Kanagawa Prefecture) was a Japanese guitarist, lyricist, composer, record producer, and businessman. He was known for producing for Kiyotaka Sugiyama, Carlos Toshiki, Toshiki Kadomatsu, Momoko Kikuchi, and Lazy.

Biography

Early life and career 
Fujita was born on March 20, 1947 in Chiba, Chiba Prefecture, Japan. As a child, he loved playing football, but spent most of his days alone because his mother died and his father remarried. He attended Chiba Prefectural Chiba High School where he heard a Beatles record, and bought an electric guitar. He was scouted by Watanabe Productions and debuted in 1967 as a member of Out Cast. He served as the guitarist after the previous guitarist, Shuichi Katagiri, left the band shortly before the band's debut. He left in the summer of 1967 after writing three songs, and would form The Love with Yuji Takamiya, Arai Hideo, Yasufumi Tajima (known as "Fumio Shimada" and "Heckel Tajima"), and Hiroshi Kobata. The band dissolved in 1969.

Production career 
In 1980, he scouted Kiyotaka Sugiyama, Shinji Takashima, and Toshitsugu Nishihara from the band Kyutipanchosu. In 1983, Kiyotaka Sugiyama & Omega Tribe debuted with "Summer Suspicion", which peaked at No. 9 on the Oricon charts. He produced all albums by the band. After the band broke up, he scouted Carlos Toshiki, making him the lead vocalist of 1986 Omega Tribe before the name changed to Carlos Toshiki & Omega Tribe. Fujita produced all albums for both variations.

In 1979, Fujita listened to Toshiki Kadomatsu's demo tape. In 1980, Lazy keyboardist Shunji Inoue and the choir group Trois formed the unit "BIG BANG." In March 1981, he produced their cover of Ai No Corrida, establishing Bermuda Music Publishing in the same year. In 1982, he produced Kadomatsu's album, Weekend Fly to the Sun, and in 1984, produced and wrote for Momoko Kikuchi's debut album, Ocean Side.

Many of the songs and albums Fujita produced were hits and succeeded commercially. They were known as the "Triangle Sound".

Later life and death 
After 1995, he stopped producing and concentrated on being president of his company. Fujita died on October 11, 2009 from diabetes.

References 

1947 births
2009 deaths
Japanese composers
Japanese lyricists
Japanese male composers
Japanese record producers
People from Chiba Prefecture
Omega Tribe (Japanese band) members
20th-century Japanese male musicians
Deaths from diabetes